Almedina is a former civil parish in the municipality of Coimbra, Portugal. In 2013, the parish merged into the new parish Coimbra (Sé Nova, Santa Cruz, Almedina e São Bartolomeu). In 2011, its population was over 900 inhabitants, in an area west of University Hill in Coimbra, covering 1.01 km²

References

Former parishes of Coimbra